Dilip Kumar Paul (born March 19, 1956 in Silchar, Assam) is an Indian politician and was the  leader of the Bharatiya Janata Party who is elected to the assembly from the Silchar constituency twice. Once in by-election against congress leader Arun Mazumder and another against senior congress leader Bhitika Dev wife of former union minister Sontosh Mohan Dev. But he left BJP, in 2020-21, by carrying out some of the controversial issues within the party.

References

1956 births
Living people
Assam MLAs 2011–2016
Assam MLAs 2016–2021
Bharatiya Janata Party politicians from Assam
Deputy Speakers of the Assam Legislative Assembly
People from Silchar